Patriarch Theodotus may refer to:

 Theodotus of Antioch, patriarch of Antioch in 420–429
 Theodotus I of Constantinople, Ecumenical Patriarch in 815–821
 Theodotus II of Constantinople, Ecumenical Patriarch in 1151–1153